Reinu may refer to several places in Estonia:

Reinu, Tartu County, village in Tartu Parish, Tartu County
Reinu, Pärnu County, village in Saarde Parish, Pärnu County